Jørgen Wichfeld (born Jørgen Wichmand, 1 July 1729 19 December 1797) was a Danish landowner, industrialist and deputy district judge from Lolland-Falster who was ennobled by letters patent on 23 July 1777. He owned Engestofte on Lolland, Ulriksdal  and from 1774 to 1787 also Nordfeld on Møn.

Biography
Jørgen Wichmand was born at Engestofte in the island of Lolland as the oldest of two sons of Bertel Wichmand (1677-1732) and Bodil Cathrine Wichmand  née From (died 1760). His father was a wealthy merchant from Nykøbing Falster who had acquired the estate on which his son was born in  1727.

Jørgen Wichmand took over Engestofte after his mother's death in 1760. He expanded his holdings by acquiring Ulriksdal in 1766 and also bought Nordfeld on Møn at auction in 1774 but sold it again in 1787. He obtained a royal license to open a starch and cosmetic powder factory at Engestofte  in 1770.

Jørgen Wichmand and his brother Thomas Frederik Wichmand were ennobled by letters patent with the name Wichfeld on 23 July 1777.

He was a deputy district judge at Lolland-Falsters landsting in 1769-87 and was appointed to etatsråd in 1779.

Legacy
Jørgen Wichfeld never married and had no children. He left his two estates to his nephew Henning Wichfeld with an obligation to turn them into a stamhus (family foundation). This happened on 8 November 1799.

References

Danish nobility
18th-century Danish landowners
Danish industrialists
18th-century Danish businesspeople
1729 births
1797 deaths
People from Guldborgsund Municipality
Jørgen